Lac de Nino is a lake in Haute-Corse, France. At an elevation of 1743 m, its surface area is 0.065 km².

The lake is on the Tavignano river near to its source below the  Bocca a Reta.
It is on the boundary between the communes of Casamaccioli and Corte.
The river flows through marshy land above and below the lake.

References

Sources

Lakes of Haute-Corse
Nino